The men's singles soft tennis event was part of the soft tennis programme and took place between August 28 and 29, at the Jakabaring Sport City Tennis Court.

Schedule
All times are Western Indonesia Time (UTC+07:00)

Results

Preliminary round

Group A

Group B

Group C

Group D

Group E

Group F

Group G

Group H

Knockout round

References 

 Results Book

External links 
Soft tennis at the 2018 Asian Games – Men's singles

Soft tennis at the 2018 Asian Games